Razor blade steel, also known as razor steel, is a special type of stainless steel designed specifically to be used as a razor blade. Its defining characteristics are its chemical composition and shape. Jindal Stainless is the world's largest producer of razor blade stainless steel.

Chemical composition
Razor blade steel is a martensitic stainless steel with a composition of chromium between 12 and 14.5%, a carbon content of approximately 0.6%, and the remainder iron and trace elements.

Shape
The thickness cannot exceed .

References

Bibliography
.
.
.

Steels